XL Cola was a cola-flavoured soft drink produced in Sweden.

XL Cola was introduced by Falcon Brewery in 1985, including the slogan "Extra Large Taste", as a competitor for the Swedish customers of Coca-Cola who didn't like the New Coke.

In 1996, Falcon Brewery was taken over by Carlsberg Group and in 2006 the trademark XL Cola was also taken over by Carlsberg Sweden. The trademark also contains an image mark, the letters XL over narrow stripes and the word Cola in smaller letters. The brand is not manufactured at present (2015), probably because Carlsberg owns the Swedish license for Pepsi.

See also
 List of defunct consumer brands

Sources

Cola brands
Defunct drink brands